1974 Women's Nordic Football Championship was the first edition of the Women's Nordic Football Championship tournament. It was held from 26 July to 28 July in Mariehamn and Finström in Åland.

The match between Denmark and Sweden was the first international of the Denmark women's national football team.

Standings

Results

Goalscorers 
3 goals
  Annette Frederiksen

2 goals
  Susanne Niemann

1 goal
  Ann Jansson
  Ann Stengård

Sources 
Nordic Championships (Women) 1974 Rec.Sport.Soccer Statistics Foundation
Landsholdsdatabasen Danish Football Association
Lautela, Yrjö & Wallén, Göran: Rakas jalkapallo — Sata vuotta suomalaista jalkapalloa, p. 418. Football Association of Finland / Teos Publishing 2007. .

References 

Women's Nordic Football Championship
1973–74 in European football
1974 in women's association football
1974
Football in Åland
1974 in Finnish football
1974 in Swedish football
1974 in Danish football
July 1974 sports events in Europe
1974 in Finnish women's sport